Seahaven is an extinct town in Pacific County, in the U.S. state of Washington.

Seahaven was laid out in the late 1880s.  A post office called Sea Haven was established in 1890, and remained in operation until 1891.

References

Ghost towns in Washington (state)
Geography of Pacific County, Washington